Hillen may refer to:

Hillen (surname), a surname
Hillen, Baltimore, a neighborhood of Baltimore, Maryland, United States
Hillen (automobile), a Dutch automobile